Ludus amoris is a term in the Western mystical tradition that refers to the divine play (play of God). The term is in Latin and may first have been used by the Christian mystic Henry Suso (1300–1366). The term has also been used in the titles of works of literature and music.

Ludus amoris is a Latin-derived term from the Western mystical tradition. Literally, "ludus amoris" means "game of love".
According to Evelyn Underhill's Mysticism,

According to Windeatt, "The notion of the play of love (ludus amoris) probably derives via Suso from Stimulus Amoris. The Middle English version of Suso's Horologium refers to 'þe pleye of loue þe which I am wonte to vse in an amarose sowle'."

See also
Lila (Hinduism), the divine play

References

External links
Example of ludus amoris in Horologium of Henry Suso (Google book image)

Latin religious words and phrases
Mysticism